A referendum on the Charter of National Unity was held in Burundi on 9 February 1991. The charter would abolish ethnic discrimination and give a mandate for the government to write a new constitution. It was approved by 89.77% of voters with a 96% turnout. Following the Charter's approval, work began on the drafting of a new constitution which was approved in a referendum held on 9 March 1992. It was promulgated on 13 March 1992.

Results

References

1991
1991 in Burundi
1991 referendums
Constitutional referendums